Bicyclus tanzanicus is a butterfly in the family Nymphalidae. It is found in western Tanzania.

References

Elymniini
Butterflies described in 1986
Endemic fauna of Tanzania
Butterflies of Africa